Stories is the second studio album by Swedish electronic music producer Avicii, released on 2 October 2015 by PRMD Music and Island Records. It was produced by Avicii along with Salem Al Fakir, Alex Ebert, Carl Falk, Kristoffer Fogelmark, Martin Garrix, Dhani Lennevald, Ash Pournouri, Albin Nedler, and Vincent Pontare on several tracks. 

Stories was released to mixed to positive reviews from critics. Four singles were released from the album: "Waiting for Love", "Pure Grinding", "For a Better Day", and "Broken Arrows", along with the promotional singles "Ten More Days" and "Gonna Love Ya". Stories has sold one million copies worldwide as of November 2015, and was the fourth most-streamed album of the year worldwide on Spotify.

Background
In July 2014, Avicii told Rolling Stone that he had worked on 70 songs for his next album and would include collaborations with Jon Bon Jovi, Billie Joe Armstrong, Chris Martin, Wyclef Jean, Serj Tankian and Matisyahu. Describing the album, Avicii said: "It's going to be a lot more song-oriented." On 2 March 2015, Avicii performed live at Australia's Future Music Festival. A lot of songs were leaked onto the internet from Avicii's UMF 2015 set. These songs include "Waiting for Love", "For a Better Day", "City Lights" and "Sunset Jesus", leaked under the name "Attack". A complete track listing of the set can be found on Avicii's SoundCloud page.

On 22 May 2015, Avicii premiered his first single from Stories, "Waiting for Love". The track was co-produced by DJ and producer Martin Garrix. Almost a month later, Avicii communicated through Twitter that he had finished the album after two years of work. On 4 August 2015, it was announced on iHeartMedia Summit that Avicii's next single from Stories was "For a Better Day", featuring singer Alex Ebert. On 28 August, he released his next two singles, the other being "Pure Grinding".

Singles
"Waiting for Love" is a song featuring Simon Aldred of Cherry Ghost. Avicii released it on the 22 May 2015. "For a Better Day" is a song featuring Alex Ebert. Avicii released it on 28 August 2015. "Pure Grinding" is a song featuring Kristoffer Fogelmark and Earl St. Clair. Avicii released it on 28 August 2015. "Broken Arrows" is a song featuring Zac Brown of Zac Brown Band. Avicii first released it on 29 September 2015, three days ahead of the album release as a pre-order single. It became an official single during October 2015.

Promotional singles
"Ten More Days" is a song featuring Zak Abel. Avicii released it on 30 September 2015, two days ahead of album release as a pre-order single. "Gonna Love Ya” is a song featuring Sandro Cavazza. Avicii released it on 1 October 2015, one day ahead of the album release as a pre-order single.

Critical reception

The album received positive reviews. At Metacritic, the album received a score of 64, indicating favourable reviews. David Jeffries from AllMusic gave the album a positive review, stating that "the pleasing, alive, and diverse Stories is a fine reason to think of Avicii as a producer of attractive music, with EDM, pop, and all other genres on a sliding scale." The Boston Globes Maura Johnston says that "Stories drags a bit at the end, the low point being a reggae-lite track starring former Fugee Wyclef Jean and the fusion-minded Matisyahu, but when it hits, it hits big." Michaelangelo Matos, from Billboard, gives the album a mixed-positive review, praising "Talk to Myself", "Touch Me" and "City Lights", saying they "are more or less direct Daft Punk homages, with a filtered, boogie-disco feel, playful effects and found-sound cut-ups".

Track listing

Personnel

Vocals

 Simon Aldred (track 1)
 Sterling Fox (track 2)
 Celeste Waite (track 3)
 Zak Abel (track 4)
 Alex Ebert (track 5)
 Zac Brown (track 6)
 Chris Martin (track 7)
 Avicii (track 7)
 Noonie Bao (track 8)
 Jonas Wallin (track 8)
 Kristoffer Fogelmark (track 9)
 Earl St. Clair (tracks 9, 14)
 Sandro Cavazza (track 10)
 Matisyahu (track 11)
 Wyclef Jean (track 11)
 Daniel Adams-Ray (track 12)
 Wayne Hector (track 13)
 Sandro Cavazza (track 14)
 Robbie Williams (track 15)
 Brandon Flowers (track 15)
 Salem Al Fakir (track 15)
 Nicholas Furlong (track 16)

Charts

Weekly charts

Year-end charts

Certifications

Release history

References

2015 albums
Avicii albums